Walter's Falls (Piper Way) Aerodrome  is an aerodrome located  east southeast of Walter's Falls, Ontario, Canada.

References

Registered aerodromes in Ontario